The Frigidaire Building or Templeton Building is a building in southeast Portland, Oregon listed on the National Register of Historic Places. The building was designed  by William C. Knighton and Leslie D. Howell and completed in 1929 for O.E. (Oscar) Heintz and occupied by Frigidaire until 1934. When prohibition was repealed in 1933, the Oregon Liquor Control Commission was created through Oregon's Knox Bill. OLCC occupied the building once Frigidare left. Later it was occupied by R.J. Templeton, an auto parts distributor.

The building was purchased by Artiste Lofts LLC in 2004 for $800,000. It had been previously owned by Joanne Ferrero. Later, the building contained Disjecta.

As of 2020 the building contains OMFGCO, a creative agency who placed a very visible quote on the building stating "Long live the wildcards, misfits & dabblers".

Further reading

See also
 National Register of Historic Places listings in Southeast Portland, Oregon

References

1929 establishments in Oregon
Buckman, Portland, Oregon
General Motors facilities
Industrial buildings and structures on the National Register of Historic Places in Portland, Oregon
Industrial buildings completed in 1929
Portland Eastside MPS
Portland Historic Landmarks